The Institute of History named after Abbasgulu Bakikhanov of Azerbaijan National Academy of Sciences is a scientific research institute affiliated with ANAS.

History 
Azerbaijan National Academy of Sciences of History Institute was established in 1935 as an independent History, Archeology and Ethnography Institute which was subject to Azerbaijani Branch of the USSR Academy of Sciences. The Institute has been operating since 1936. Within the structure of USSR Academy of Sciences’ Azerbaijani branch the institute started function as a separate scientific research institution since 1940. When the Azerbaijan SSR Academy of Sciences was organized in 1945 the History Institute was incorporated into its structure as an independent scientific institution. Later, in 1951, the Institute of History was transformed into the Institute of History and Philosophy of the Academy of Sciences of the Azerbaijan SSR and in 1956, after the creation of the Philosophy Sector affiliated with EA of Azerbaijan, it again began to function as an independent institute. In 1974, the Archeology and Ethnography Sector was established which initially operated as dependent bodies on History Institute, but since 1993, it has become a body.

Heads of the institute 
The Institute of History named after Abbasgulu Bakikhanov of Azerbaijan National Academy of Sciences has been headed by the following scientists:

 Meshchaninov Ivan Ivanovich (1936 - 1937)
 Ziffeld-Simumyagi Arthur Rudolfovich (08.05.1937 - 01.06.1937)
 Ahmadov Ahmad Ali oglu (01.06.1937 - 11.07.1937)
 Hasanov Idris Meshedi Zaman oglu (19.07.1937 - 17.02.1938)
 Kozin Yakov Dmitriyevich (09.01.1940 – 28.10.1940)
 Klimov Aleksey Alekseyevich (17.02.1938 - 01.01.1939 (1)/ 29.10.1940 - 10.04.1941 (2))
 Huseynov Ismayil Abbas oglu (10.04.1941 - 25.02.1944)
 Alizadeh Abdulkarim Ali oglu (25.02.1944 - 16.06.1950)
 Sharifli Mammadali Khalil oglu (16.06.1950 – 16.02.1951)
 Quliyev Aliovset Najafqulu oglu (05.04.1953 - 16.01.1958 (1) / 06.06.1967 – 06.11.1969 (2))
 Ibrahimov Zulfali Imamali oglu (12.11.1960 - 06.06.1967)
 Sumbatzadeh Alisohbet Sumbat oglu (16.04.1970 - 24.03.1972)
 Quliyev Jamil Bahadur oglu (27.03.1972 - 17.01.1978)
 Aliyev Igrar Hebib oglu (17.01.1978 - 11.06.2004)
 Mahmudov Yaqub Mikail oglu (13.09.2004 - 28.01.2021)
 Kerim Shukurov (28.01.2021 - onwards)

Objectives 
The History Institute affiliated with ANAS (Azerbaijan National Academy of Sciences) aims to analyze the history of the Republic of Azerbaijan. The institute has 4 directions; to conduct general scientific researches on history of Azerbaijan, historiography and source study on Azerbaijan history, political history of Azerbaijan, and the social and economic history of Azerbaijan.

Departments 

 Historical demography of Azerbaijan
 History of Azerbaijan-Russia Relations
 Azerbaijani Diaspora 
 The historical geography of Azerbaijan 
 The history of international relations
 International Relations 
 History of the Caucasus 
 The history of Garabagh 
 The General History
 Translation and Publishing 
 The Information Center 
 Public Relations Department 
 The Education Department 
 Aliyev Studies
 History of Azerbaijani Culture 
 The history of the craft
 History of the Republic of Azerbaijan 
 History of the Soviet Period of Azerbaijan 
 History of genocide against the people of Azerbaijan
 History of Azerbaijan Democratic Republic
 The new history of Azerbaijan
 Source Studies and Historiography 
 The medieval history of Azerbaijan 
 The ancient history of Azerbaijan

Collaborating organizations 

 Chakha Akhriev Research Institute of the Humanities of the Republic of Ingushetia
 T.M.Kerashev Institute of Humanitarian Studies of the Republic of Adygea
 Maikop State Technological University of the Republic of Adygea
 Institute of History, Archaeology and Ethnography of the Dagestan Scientific Center
 Autonomous Non-Commercial Organization of the RF the “Institute of History, Economics and Law”
 Peter the Great Museum of Anthropology and Ethnography (Kunstkamera)
 Sh. Mardzhani Institute of History of the Academy of Sciences of the Republic of Tatarstan

See also 
 Azerbaijan National Academy of Sciences

References

National academies of sciences
Research institutes in Azerbaijan
USSR Academy of Sciences
Science and technology in Azerbaijan
Academies of Azerbaijan
Research institutes in the Soviet Union